The 1938 Georgetown Hoyas football team, also known as the New Deal team, was an American football team that represented Georgetown University as an independent during the 1938 college football season. In their seventh season under head coach Jack Hagerty, the Hoyas compiled a perfect 8–0 record, shut out five of eight opponents, and outscored all opponents by a total of 185 to 26. The team was ranked No. 20 in the AP Poll of November 21 but dropped out of the final poll. 

The team played its home games at Griffith Stadium in Washington, D.C.

Halfback Joe Mellendeck led the team with his running, kicking, and defensive play.

Schedule

References

Georgetown
Georgetown Hoyas football seasons
College football undefeated seasons
Georgetown Hoyas football